Standover may refer to:
Standover height, a measurement of a bicycle frame
Standover tactics, a type of coercion